Sarah Campbell  may refer to:
Sarah Campbell Blaffer (1885–1975), American philanthropist.
Sarah K. Campbell (born 1982), American attorney, justice of the Tennessee Supreme Court since 2022.
Sarah Campbell (designer), British textile designer.
Sarah Campbell (born 1982), Canadian politician, member of the Ontario Provincial Parliament.
Sara Campbell, British free diver
Sarah Campbell, fictional character on Secrets of Sulphur Springs

See also
Campbell (surname)#Notable persons named Campbell